The 1886–87 Football Association Challenge Cup was the 16th FA Cup, England's oldest football tournament. One hundred and twenty-eight teams entered, two fewer than the previous season, in addition to four of the one hundred and twenty-eight never playing a match.

The Football Association also rejected a number of entries for being made too late.

First round

[*] The Cannon side (from Tottenham) had entered the competition without being registered with the Football Association, so was ineligible to play

[**] Newton Heath turned up for the match with several ineligible players, and so scratched before the game; the sides played a friendly, which ended 2-2.

Replays

Second round

Replays

Third round

Replays

Fourth round

Fifth round

Replay

Sixth Round

Semi-finals

Final

References

 FA Cup Results Archive

1886-87
1886–87 in English football
1886–87 in Scottish football
1886–87 in Welsh football
1886–87 in Irish association football
FA Cup